The Surveyor General of Arizona is served by the State Treasurer, Kimberly Yee.  Some duties of the Surveyor-General are fulfilled by the Arizona State Land Commissioner

References

Government of Arizona
American surveyors